Peter Max F. Sichel (born September 12, 1922) is a German-American wine merchant and former operative of US secret services, who worked for the  Blue Nun wine brand, for a while the largest international wine brand in the world. Prior to this he ran the CIA's operations in Berlin during the early stages of the Cold War.

Biography

Early life
Sichel was born in Mainz, Germany, in September 1922, in to a Jewish family, where his grandfather's family wine business, H. Sichel Söhne had been established in 1837. He was educated in Germany and then in 1935 was sent to be educated in England. He attended St Cyprian's School and Stowe School. While he was at school in England, his parents escaped from Nazi Germany on a ruse, and the family settled in France. The firm had offices in London and Bordeaux, and at the start of World War II, while he was apprenticed to the Bordeaux firm, he was interned as he was German.

Service with the CIA
Sichel escaped to the USA via Portugal and Spain and join the US Army a week after the bombing of Pearl Harbor, and worked at the US Office of Strategic Services, running agents in Germany for which he was given the Distinguished Intelligence Medal. Shortly after the War, he was sent to Berlin to head the secret Strategic Services Unit. He reported in early 1946 on the methods the Soviets were using to control the political parties in the Russian sector of Germany (which became East Germany).

Sichel continued to work for the Central Intelligence Agency in Berlin, Washington and Hong Kong until 1960, when he left, saying "I left because the CIA did things I didn’t like, such as send people into the Ukraine to work in fabricated resistance groups. They were potentially being sent to their deaths. I made a huge fuss."

Wine entrepreneur
He took over the family wine import business in New York, which he dissolved, instead dealing with Schieffelin, then a large drinks company. At this time, wine was taking off as a drink in America, overtaking fortified wine, and he advertised Blue Nun as a wine you can drink "right through the meal", using widespread advertising. At its peak in the 1980s, annual sales in the US reached 1.25 million cases.

Sichel has often appeared on television in Germany as a witness to the immediate post-war years in Berlin when he was head of the CIA in Berlin, and wrote several books on German wine and a guide to wine. He became chairman of the German parent company in 1984. By the 1990s, the Sichel company was sold to another German company, Langguth, and Peter had arranged sale of part of the Schieffelin company to LVMH. He was president of the International Wine and Spirit Competition in 1991. Until 2006 he owned the Bordeaux Château Fourcas-Hosten in Listrac, which he sold to Hermès.

The Blue Nun Wine brand is referenced in popular culture by band The Beastie Boys, as a track from there third album Check your Head

Personal life
Sichel is the father of the late filmmaker Alex Sichel and the screenwriter Sylvia Sichel. He turned 100 in September 2022.

Publications
 Peter M.F. Sichel and Judy Ley, Which Wine: The Wine Drinker's Buying Guide, 1975, 
 Peter M.F. Sichel, The Wines of Germany: Completely Revised Edition of Frank Schoonmaker's Classic, 1980, 
 Peter Sichel, On Wine: How to Select and Serve: Vol 1, audio recording, Columbia Special Products (CSP 151).
 Peter M.F. Sichel, The Secrets of My Life, 2016,

References

1922 births
Wine writers
Living people
Businesspeople from Mainz
People from Rhenish Hesse
People educated at Stowe School
People educated at St Cyprian's School
German emigrants to the United States
German centenarians
American centenarians
Men centenarians